Zapoge is a  settlement in the Municipality of Vodice in the Upper Carniola region of Slovenia.

Name
Zapoge was attested in written sources in 1330 as Zapaum (and as Zapozech in 1426, Sapokch in 1436, and hof zu Sepach and Sapose in 1458). The name is of uncertain origin. Based on medieval transcriptions, the current name originated as a plural accusative. In the local dialect, the settlement is known as Zəpge. In the past the German name was Seebach.

Church
The local church is dedicated to Saint Nicholas and contains one of the oldest surviving pipe organs in Slovenia.

Notable people
Notable people that were born or lived in Zapoge include:
Matija Bilban (1863–1937), Catholic priest and missionary to the United States

References

External links

Zapoge on Geopedia

Populated places in the Municipality of Vodice